Benedict Wachira (born 8 August 1985) is a Kenyan communist political and social justice activist. He is also the General Secretary of the Communist Party of Kenya (CPK).
 
Wachira was born in Nairobi’s Eastlands area, going through different schools and eventually joining the University of Nairobi where he graduated with a Bachelor of Science Degree in Mathematics and Chemistry.
It was at the University that his political career began taking shape, where he headed many organisations and students' democratic movements. Several times he was a contestant in the Student Organisation of Nairobi University (SONU) elections, and even though he was never an official of the Union, he is still considered to be one of the most influential student leaders of all time.

Political life
After graduating from the University, he took over the leadership of the Bureau of Young Socialists as its Chairperson while Booker Ngesa became the Secretary of the Bureau, which was the Youth League of the Social Democratic Party of Kenya.
In 2010, the Party was embroiled in internal Power struggles, which pitted former ministers Mutahi Kagwe, Njeru Ndwiga and Mutua Katuku against the Party Chairperson and former Member of Parliament, Mwandawiro Mghanga, and the Party remained dysfunctional for over a year.
The Youth League of the Party sided with Mwandawiro faction, which was considered to be Socialist, while the other side was considered to be liberal.
Eventually in 2011, he and Booker Ngesa organized demonstrations against the state, and filed a judicial case at the Political Parties Dispute Tribunal where they won the case therefore giving the Mwandawiro faction control of the Party.
This victory propelled his fame within the Social Democratic Party of Kenya, and he was elected the Secretary General of the Party at the Party’s National Congress of 2012, becoming the Youngest Secretary General of any political Party in Kenya at age of 27.

Other Activities
Benedict Wachira is the National Secretary of the Kenya Cuba Friendship Society (KCFS) and a member of the National Executive Committee of the Kenya Western Sahara Solidarity Association.
He was a National observer in the 2013 General Elections in Kenya, and an International Elections Observer in the Malian Presidential Elections of 2013.
He has been one of the conveners of the Africa Liberation Day celebrations in Kenya since 2010.
He has also been involved in organising numerous demonstrations in Kenya’s Capital on a wide range of social and political issues.

References

https://web.archive.org/web/20131127044235/http://sdpkenya.org/index.php/central-committee
https://web.archive.org/web/20131203005054/http://www.cmd-kenya.org/files/Registered-political-parties-inKenya.pdf
https://web.archive.org/web/20131203024223/http://www.the-star.co.ke/news/article-36738/sdp-faction-wins-suit-against-kagwe-katuku
https://web.archive.org/web/20131203021210/http://www.the-star.co.ke/news/article-29898/mwandawiro-sdp-faction-demonstrates-registrars-office
http://allafrica.com/stories/201202081122.html
http://allafrica.com/stories/201202161387.html
http://kenyastockholm.com/2012/02/16/sdp-demo-against-registrar-of-political-parties/
http://www.tmcnet.com/usubmit/2011/06/30/5607506.htm
http://www.standardmedia.co.ke/business/article/2000021375/power-play-and-heightened-political-activities-in-central
http://jukwaa.proboards.com/thread/6286
https://web.archive.org/web/20131203013624/http://www.propertykenya.com/news/1485318-demonstrators-to-sue-ppo-and-ocpd
http://camposanity.wordpress.com/tag/benedict-wachira/
http://demokrasia-kenya.blogspot.com/2012_05_01_archive.html

1985 births
Living people
Kenyan communists
Kenyan politicians